Mount Frustum is a large pyramidal shaped table mountain,  high, standing between Mount Fazio and Scarab Peak in the southern part of Tobin Mesa, in Victoria Land, Antarctica. The topographical feature was so named by the northern party of the New Zealand Geological Survey Antarctic Expedition, 1962–63, for its frustum-like shape. The mountain lies situated on the Pennell Coast, a portion of Antarctica lying between Cape Williams and Cape Adare.

References

Mountains of Victoria Land
Pennell Coast